Kedros Kormakiti was a Cypriot association football club based in Kormakiti, located in the Keryneia District. Its colours were green, red and white. It has 4 participations in Cypriot Fourth Division. On 1989 merged with Libanos Kormakiti to form Kormakitis FC.

References

Defunct football clubs in Cyprus
Association football clubs established in 1972
1972 establishments in Cyprus
Association football clubs disestablished in 1989